Strange Way of Life is an upcoming Pedro Almodóvar short western film starring Ethan Hawke and Pedro Pascal. The film will premiere at the 2023 Cannes Film Festival in May 2023.

Synopsis
After twenty-five years, Silva rides a horse across the desert to visit his friend Sheriff Jake. They celebrate the meeting, but the next morning Jake tells him that reason for his trip is not to go down the memory lane of their friendship.

Cast
Ethan Hawke as Sheriff Jake
Pedro Pascal as Silva
Manu Rios
José Condessa
Jason Fernández
Sara Sálamo
Erenice Lohan as Clara
Pedro Casablanc
George Steane

Production
Principal photography took place in Southern Spain in August 2022, in the Tabernas Desert section of Almeria. A Strange Way of Life is the title of an old Portuguese fado song by Amália Rodrigues. The filming took place with Pedro Almodóvar's own production company El Deseo in conjunction with Saint Laurent, whose head designer Anthony Vaccarello was also an associate producer and the film's costume designer. In September, Hawke confirmed the production has wrapped filming via Instagram.

Speaking on the Dua Lipa podcast the director was quoted as saying "it's a queer Western, in the sense that there are two men and they love each other. It's about masculinity in a deep sense because the Western is a male genre. What I can tell you about the film is that it has a lot of the elements of the Western. It has the gunslinger, it has the ranch, it has the sheriff, but what it has that most Westerns don't have is the kind of dialogue that I don't think a Western film has ever captured between two men."

Release
The film is set to premiere at the 2023 Cannes Film Festival in May 2023.

References

External links 

Upcoming films
Films directed by Pedro Almodóvar
Films produced by Agustín Almodóvar
English-language Spanish films
Spanish drama films
Spanish short films
El Deseo films
2020s English-language films
2020s American films
2020s Western (genre) films
2023 LGBT-related films
American LGBT-related short films
Spanish LGBT-related films
LGBT-related drama films
American Western (genre) films
Spanish Western (genre) films